Clinical Infectious Diseases is a peer-reviewed medical journal published by Oxford University Press covering research on the pathogenesis, clinical investigation, medical microbiology, diagnosis, immune mechanisms, and treatment of diseases caused by infectious agents. It includes articles on antimicrobial resistance, bioterrorism, emerging infections, food safety, hospital epidemiology, and HIV/AIDS. It also features highly focused brief reports, review articles, editorials, commentaries, and supplements. The journal is published on behalf of the Infectious Diseases Society of America.

According to the Journal Citation Reports, the journal had a 2020 impact factor of 9.079, ranking it 18th out of 162 journals in the category "Immunology", 3rd out of 92 journals in the category "Infectious Diseases" and 12th out of 137 journals in the category "Microbiology".

Past Editors
 Reviews of Infectious Diseases
 Edward H. Kass, 1979-1989 (vols. 1–11)
 Sydney M. Finegold, 1990–1991 (vols. 12 & 13)
 Clinical Infectious Diseases
 Sydney M. Finegold, 1992–1999 (vols. 14–29)
 Sherwood L. Gorbach, 2000–2016 (vols. 30–63)

References

External links 
 

Oxford University Press academic journals
Microbiology journals
Biweekly journals
English-language journals
Publications established in 1979